Snak (Danish for "chat") was a shareware Internet Relay Chat (IRC) client written by Kent Sorensen for the Macintosh platform. Snak was distributed as shareware and could be freely used and evaluated for 30 days at no charge. After the 30-day evaluation period has ended, the program would quit after 15 minutes of use, and a registration key had to be purchased. Versions up to 4.12 run on both Mac OS 9 and Mac OS X while version 5 and newer only support Mac OS X. The program is Intel Only as of version 5.3.4. The program is not fully compatible with current macOS versions and is no longer supported, with the developer stating that he is unable to create new versions due to the deprecation of the Carbon libraries. On October 10, 2018, Snak was declared abandonware by the developer and made freeware with a license key published on the project's web site.

Features
Snak supports an unlimited number of connections and channels, private chats, as well as full DCC support for file transfers and chat. It can be scripted with AppleScript and the ircII scripting language. Snak features an Actions list which makes it easy to automate responses to many common events on IRC.

Snak includes the ability for multiple panels to share the windows. A panel can contain a channel, a dialog with another user, a list, or information about a DCC file transfer. This results in an effective use of the screen space and improves the ability to follow multiple channels. A panel can be moved from one window to another by dragging the title bar or the panel tab.

Although limited support UTF-8 support has been included since version 5.1.5 (released 2006-09-23), as of December 30, 2014, full UTF-8 support is still lacking (promised for "the next major version").

Reception
Jason Parker, Assistant editor for Download.com, wrote for CNET Reviews on May 26, 2005, "If you want a great IRC chat client for Mac, Snak is hands-down the best in the category."

References

Internet Relay Chat clients
Classic Mac OS Internet Relay Chat clients
MacOS Internet Relay Chat clients
Shareware
Discontinued software
Orphan works